Štrukljeva Vas is a small village east of Begunje in the Municipality of Cerknica in the Inner Carniola region of Slovenia.

Name
The name Štrukljeva Vas literally means 'Štrukelj's village' (Štrukelj is a surname in the area). The possessive form of the village's name indicates that it is located in an area that was cleared and settled relatively late.

Church

The local church is a chapel of ease dedicated to Saint James and belongs to the Parish of Sveti Vid. The church has a gilded altar from the second half of the 17th century with some late Baroque additions. The altar was renovated in 1928 by the wood-carver Franc Bečaj from Cerknica. The bell tower is several centuries old and appears to have been built as a separate structure. It contains a copper bell dating to 1445. Oral tradition relates that the villagers received the bell from Trsat in exchange for rights to a fair that was held below Kapelšče Hill (770 m) north of the village.

Notable people
Notable people that were born or lived in Štrukljeva Vas include:
Ivo Lah (1896–1979), statistician
Ivan Štrukelj (1880–1952), teacher

References

External links

Štrukljeva Vas on Geopedia

Populated places in the Municipality of Cerknica